The 1919–20 Notre Dame Fighting Irish men's ice hockey season was the 3rd season of play for the program.

Season
After World War I Notre Dame resurrected its program which had existed briefly before the war. The team was coached by team captain Paul Castner but with few available opponents they played just two games all season.

Roster

Standings

Schedule and results

|-
!colspan=12 style=";" | Regular Season

References

Notre Dame Fighting Irish men's ice hockey seasons
Notre Dame
Notre Dame
Notre Dame
Notre Dame